Matthew Taylor  (born 5 December 1960) is a British former political strategist and current Chief Executive of the NHS Confederation, having previously led the Royal Society for the Encouragement of Arts, Manufactures and Commerce (RSA) in the United Kingdom between 2006 and 2021. In 2005, he was appointed by incumbent Prime Minister Tony Blair as head of the Number 10 Policy Unit. He is a writer, public speaker and broadcaster who has been a panellist on BBC Radio 4's The Moral Maze since 2008. In October 2016, he was appointed Chair of the Review of Modern Employment established by Prime Minister Theresa May; the Taylor Review report Good Work was published in July 2017.

Background
Taylor is the only son of the sociologist and broadcaster Laurie Taylor and the historian Jennie Howells. He was educated at Emanuel School, the University of Southampton and University of Warwick. He has three children.

Career
Taylor became a Labour Party Warwickshire county councillor, and unsuccessfully sought to become the Labour Party Member of Parliament for Warwick and Leamington in the 1992 general election. In 1994 he was put in charge of the Labour Party's rebuttal operation, becoming a Campaign Co-ordinator and Director of Policy during the 1997 general election. He helped to write the Labour Party manifesto, the pledge-card, and developed Excalibur, a rapid rebuttal database for use against the Conservative Party. Taylor became Assistant General Secretary of the Labour Party under Margaret McDonagh, but after clashes with her left in December 1998.
 
Between 1998 and 2003, Taylor was the Director of the left of centre think tank the Institute for Public Policy Research, and in 2003 the Labour Prime Minister Tony Blair appointed him head of the Number 10 Policy Unit, giving him the task of drawing up the Labour Party's manifesto for the May 2005 general election. Following the re-election of the Labour government he became Chief Adviser on Strategy to the Prime Minister. Taylor was involved in several initiatives to engage the public with the political process, and played a role in developing the Labour Party's "Big Conversation" discussion forums. 
 
He left in 2006 to become Chief Executive of the charity the Royal Society of Arts.
 
Taylor has been awarded honorary degrees from the universities of Brighton, Northampton and Warwick, and is a visiting professor at Nottingham Trent University. He has sat on a number of Governmental committees and inquiries on topics including higher education in Wales, the role of elected councillors, innovation in children's services and spinning out public services as social enterprises.

He is a regular panellist on Radio 4's Moral Maze, devised and presents the discussion programme, Agree to Differ, which was first broadcast in 2014, and is an occasional presenter of Analysis. His opinions pieces have been published in several national newspapers, he has a monthly column with the Local Government Chronicle, writes occasional book reviews for Management Today and has contributed extended essays to publications such as Political Quarterly and written pamphlets and chapters for a number of books.

As well as his annual RSA Chief Executive lecture, he is a regular public speaker on topics including public service reform, social trends and education policy. He has chaired lectures and conferences for many organisations including the RSA, the Heritage Lottery Fund, Intelligence Squared and the Cabinet Office.

In December 2020, he announced that he would be standing down from the RSA in 2021, subsequently being appointed as Chief Executive of the NHS Confederation.

Honours
In 2016, Taylor was elected a Fellow of the Academy of Social Sciences (FAcSS). He was appointed Commander of the Order of the British Empire (CBE) in the 2019 Birthday Honours for services to employee rights.

References

External links
 Matthew Taylor's blog
 Column archives at Journalisted
 Royal Society for the encouragement of Arts, Manufactures and Commerce (The RSA) 
 

1960 births
Living people
Labour Party (UK) officials
Alumni of the University of Southampton
Alumni of the University of Warwick
Councillors in Warwickshire
People educated at Emanuel School
British special advisers
Fellows of the Academy of Social Sciences
Commanders of the Order of the British Empire